Light beer is a beer, usually a pale lager, that is reduced in alcohol content or in calories compared to regular beers. The first use of the term in marketing was in the 1940s when the Coors Brewing Company sold Coors Light, for a short period before World War II, relaunching it more successfully in 1978 as a 4.2% abv pale lager. In 1967, the Rheingold Brewery marketed a 4.2% pale lager, Gablinger's Diet Beer, developed  by American biochemist Joseph Owades, as a beer for people dieting. It was not successful, and the recipe was given to Peter Hand Brewing Company of Chicago, who sold it as Meister Brau Lite. Peter Hand later rebranded itself as Meister Brau Brewing (to highlight their flagship product in an attempt to go national), but after encountering financial problems in 1972, they sold the Meister Brau line of beers to Miller Brewing Company. The latter relaunched the beer as Miller Lite.

Light beers may be chosen by beer drinkers who wish to manage their alcohol consumption or their calorie intake; however, they are sometimes criticised for being less flavourful than full-strength beers, or for tasting or actually being

Reduced alcohol

Light beers with lower alcohol content allow consumers to drink more beers in a shorter period without becoming intoxicated. Low alcohol content can also mean a less expensive beer, especially where excise is determined by alcohol content.

This is the primary definition of the term in countries such as Australia and Scotland. In Australia, regular beers have approximately 5% alcohol by volume; light beers may have  alcohol. In Scotland, the term derives from shilling categories, where 'light' customarily means a beer with less than 3.5% alcohol by volume.

Reduced calories
Reducing the caloric content of beer is accomplished primarily by reducing the carbohydrate content, and secondarily by reducing the alcohol content, since both carbohydrates and alcohol contribute to the caloric content of beer. Unlike reduced-alcohol light beers, the alcohol reduction is not primarily intended to produce a less intoxicating beverage.

This is the primary definition in the United States, where the spelling Lite beer is also encountered, and where popular light beers include Bud Light, Miller Lite, and Coors Light.

See also
Diet drink
Fat substitute

References

Beer styles